My TV is a Bangladeshi Bengali-language satellite and cable television channel owned and operated by V.M. International Limited. It began broadcasting on 15 April 2010, and is based in Hatirjheel, Dhaka. My TV was founded by late Omeda Begum as a goal to spread the Bengali language and culture. The channel primarily broadcasts entertainment and news programming.

History
My TV originally began broadcasting in around the mid-2000s, but was later shut down along with six other television channels in 2007 for allegedly broadcasting without permission from the government. It later resumed broadcasting with the "Srishtite Bismoy" (সৃষ্টিতে বিস্ময়) slogan on 15 April 2010, after the Bangladesh Telecommunication Regulatory Commission granted them a license to broadcast on 20 October 2009, alongside several other Bangladeshi privately owned television channels.

In 2016, Begum's son, Nasir Uddin Sathi, became the chairman and managing director of My TV. On 19 May 2019, the channel, along with five other channels, began broadcasting via the Bangabandhu-1 satellite after signing an agreement with BSCL. My TV commenced high-definition broadcasts on 1 February 2021.

Programming 
 Chobir Hat
 Music View
 My Songlap
 Rupali Pordar Gaan

See also
 List of television stations in Bangladesh
 List of Bangladeshi television and radio channels

References

External links
 
 My TV Live Online
 

Television channels in Bangladesh
Television channels and stations established in 2010
2010 establishments in Bangladesh